In Ireland, counties are divided into civil parishes, and these parishes are further divided into townlands. The following is a list of townlands sorted by parish in County Londonderry, Northern Ireland:

Parishes

Aghadowey

Aghanloo

Agivey

Ardboe (County Londonderry portion)

Artrea (County Londonderry portion)

Ballinderry

Ballyaghran

Ballymoney (County Londonderry portion)

Ballynascreen

Ballyrashane (County Londonderry portion)

Ballyscullion  (County Londonderry portion)

Ballywillin

Balteagh

Banagher

Bovevagh

Carrick

Clondermot

Coleraine

Cumber Lower

Cumber Upper

Derryloran (County Londonderry portion)

Desertlyn

Desertmartin

Desertoghill

Drumachose

Dunboe

Dungiven

Errigal

Faughanvale

Formoyle

Grange of Scullion (County Londonderry portion)

Kilcronaghan

Kildollagh (County Londonderry portion)

Killelagh

Killowen

Kilrea

Learmount (County Londonderry portion)

Lissan (County Londonderry portion)

Macosquin

Maghera

Magherafelt

Magilligan (Tamlaghtard)

Tamlaght  (Co. Londonderry portion)

Tamlaght Finlagan

Tamlaght O'Crilly

Templemore

Termoneeny

See also
List of civil parishes of County Londonderry
County Londonderry, Northern Ireland
Maps Of Townlands, Civil Parishes and Baronies https://www.townlands.ie/londonderry/

References

 
Londonderry
Londonderry
Londonderry
Townlands